Robert Augustus Hardee (May 27, 1833 – November 27, 1909) was a member of the Florida House of Representatives in the sessions of 1873, 1874, and 1897. He was also a member of the Brevard County Board of Commissioners.

He was the son of Thomas E. Hardee and Grace Jones, and the brother of Gardner S. Hardee, and Buddy Hardee.

He moved to New Haven, Florida (the original name of Sebastian) in 1889.

See also 
 List of members of the Florida House of Representatives from Brevard County, Florida

References 

1833 births
1909 deaths
Confederate States Army officers
County commissioners in Florida
Florida pioneers
Democratic Party members of the Florida House of Representatives
People from Sebastian, Florida
People from Georgia (U.S. state)
People of Georgia (U.S. state) in the American Civil War
19th-century American politicians